Gjorgji Bojadžiev (born in 1950, Novo Selo) was a Macedonian general who served as the Chief of General Staff of the Army of the Republic of Macedonia (2004–2005).

Biography 
Bojadžiev was born in the eastern Macedonian village of Novo Selo in 1950, then part of the Socialist Federal Republic of Yugoslavia.

Education 
He graduated from the Military Academy in Belgrade in 1973, and from the Command and Staff College in Skopje in 1995. Bojadžiev went on a language course in Montreal, Canada, in 1999, and attended a military academy in Paris from 2000 to 2001.

Military career 
His first duty was commander of a platoon, then he became assistant commander for political education, and for some time was the commander of a division, then the Border Guard Brigade, and from 1 January 2004 was the head of the Operations Division on the ARM General Staff. Bojadziev became a lieutenant in 1973, the following year he received the rank lieutenant. In 1986 was promoted to Major, followed by Lieutenant Colonel, and in 2002 he became a brigadier general. Following his appointment to Chief of General Staff, Bojadziev was promoted to major general. He was replaced as the Chief of General Staff in 2005 by Miroslav Stojanovski.

References 

Living people
1950 births
Yugoslav People's Army personnel
Army of North Macedonia personnel